An American Tail: The Mystery of the Night Monster (also known as An American Tail 4: The Mystery of the Night Monster) is a 1999 American animated adventure film directed and produced by Larry Latham. It is the second direct-to-video follow-up to An American Tail as well as the fourth and final film of the series. The film premiered on December 9, 1999, in Germany, and was released on July 25, 2000, in the United States and Canada. While the actors retain their voices for the original characters (with the exception of Erica Yohn as Jane Singer took over her role for Mama Mousekewitz), this film introduces new characters and voices of Susan Boyd, Robert Hays, John Garry, Candi Milo, John Mariano, Jeff Bennett, and Joe Lala, completely omitting the previous film’s characters. Universal Cartoon Studios ceased production of the series after this sequel's completion. Thomas Dekker received a Young Artist Award for Best Performance in a Voice-Over for Fievel.

Plot 
After the events of the third film, but before the second, Fievel, his sister Tanya, and his friend Tony get jobs at the local newspaper. The Mousekewitz children and Tony meet Nellie Brie, who wants to be an important reporter, but only gets small assignments, as if she were a secretary to Reed Daley, the newspaper's editor.

Nellie gets a chance when she is assigned to report on mice who disappear overnight into holes that open up on their floor all over New York City. Reed makes up a, as Nellie calls it, "so-called monster" that lives under Manhattan and takes mice away during the night to add more excitement to the otherwise unimportant story, intending to sell more papers. The night monster creates fears among the readers, as could be expected. Fievel begins having nightmares that cause him to lose sleep because of his fear of the monster; the film opens up with Fievel having a dream about being chased by what he thinks the monster looks like (a fiery demonic cat with a mouse trap on its tongue). When, through Tanya, he is assigned the job of following Nellie and drawing up interpretations of what the monster looks like based on witness testimony, this makes his insomnia all the worse. A particularly suspicious miniature French poodle named Madame Mousey, who has started living among the mice about this time, appears at every crime scene, claiming to be a fortune teller. The heroes finally decide to investigate her by means of the "dog council" that meets at Central Park. They also search down one of the holes, which leads directly to a group of cats known as the infamous Outlaw Cats hiding in the sewers. All the mice that had disappeared are being held in wood cages there, to be sold off to other cats and eaten.

The night monster itself, a mechanic device with ghastly flashing pictures and a circular saw, is revealed in full when it attacks the mice newspaper office and printing press to prevent them from printing the truth, which they had just discovered. A great chase scene takes place throughout both the mouse and the human newspaper offices. Reed finally wins Nellie‘s heart and ended up in a relationship. When all the cats seem to be under control, the "dog council" appears just as they are regaining consciousness and chase them all away, taking Madame Mousey with them. As the film ends, the last scene takes place at the beach, where Tony informed the Mousekewitz family that the "dog council" had chosen for the French poodle (who was the mastermind behind the night monster all along) a punishment worse than prison: returning her to her owner, Mrs. Abernathy. Mama Mousekewitz surmises saying that now that the mystery has been cleared up, Fievel finally goes to sleep, only to turn around and find him with Yasha his sister already asleep on the beach towel, to which Papa smiles and says, "You were saying?" The Mousekewitz family, including Tony and Tiger, share a group hug as Mama says, "Sweet dreams, my little Fievel. Sweet dreams."

Cast 
 Thomas Dekker as Fievel Mousekewitz
 Lacey Chabert as Tanya Mousekewitz
 Nehemiah Persoff as Papa Mousekewitz
 Jane Singer as Mama Mousekewitz
 Dom DeLuise as Tiger
 Keith David as Monster of Manhattan (uncredited)
 Pat Musick as Tony Toponi and Mrs. Abernathy
 Susan Boyd as Nellie Brie
 Robert Hays as Reed Daley
 John Garry as Lone Woof
 Candi Milo as Madame Mousey
 John Mariano as Twitch
 Jeff Bennett as Slug and The Great Dane
 Joe Lala as Bootlick
 Sherman Howard as Haggis

Production 
Like the previous direct-to-video sequel, this film was directed by Larry Latham, except it was animated by another overseas company Tama Productions as Universal would end production of An American Tail film series after completing this film. Most of the previous actors reprise their roles for the franchise’s original characters, except Erica Yohn as she retired from acting after casting for Mama Mousekewitz in The Treasure of Manhattan Island, which was her last film role. Jane Singer was chosen to take over Yohn’s role for the character in this film. While omitting the previous sequel’s characters from this film without public explanation, new characters and voices are introduced. Susan Boyd was chosen to voice for Nellie Brie, as Boyd previously cast as Daisy in Rover Dangerfield and lip-synced for Cameron Diaz as Tina Carlyle‘s singing voice in The Mask. Robert Hays, the known actor for Airplane!, was chosen to voice for Reed Daley. The villains are voiced by Candi Milo (Madame Mousey), Jeff Bennett (Slug), and John Mariano (Twitch), who are all well known voice actors in the animation industry. 

This film was originally scheduled to be released in June 1999, but was put on hold for over a year as it would not reach the markets until after releasing The Treasure of Manhattan Island first, which got delayed until the beginning of the 21st century for posthumous reasons.

Soundtrack 
 "Get the Facts", Performed by Susan Boyd and Thomas Dekker
 "Creature de la Nuit", Performed by Candi Milo, Joe Lala and Jeff Bennett
 "Who Will", Performed by Susan Boyd, Thomas Dekker, Pat Musick and Dom DeLuise

Release 
Universal Studios Home Video released this fourth installment on VHS in North America on July 25, 2000. Then, it was released on DVD in 2004, with a sing-along version of "Creature de la Nuit" as a bonus feature. It was combined with three other films on June 13, 2017.

Overseas
Before the North American release, it first premiered in Germany in December 1999. Then it was released in the United Kingdom on March 6, 2000. It was also released on November 2, 2004 in Australia, January 5, 2005 in Spain, June 23, 2005 in Japan, October 5, 2005 in Italy, October 31, 2005 in Russia and February 3, 2006 in France.

Reception 
David Parkinson of Radio Times rated it 2/5 stars and criticized the film's ethnic stereotyping. Parkinson concluded: "But, apart from a couple of imaginatively eerie dream sequences, there's little here to hold the attention of even the least discriminating youngster". Michael Scheinfeld of Common Sense Media, gave it positive reviews compared to the previous installment, describing it as "a mystery with spunk, courage, and heart", since this movie encourages the children how to overcome their fears. Felix Vasquez Jr. called it "a nice diversion and mediocre finale to the animated series".

Accolades 
Young Artist Award
 Best Voiceover Performance - Thomas Dekker (Fievel Mousekewitz)

References

External links 
 

1999 films
1999 animated films
1999 direct-to-video films
1990s American animated films
Films scored by Michael Tavera
American mystery films
1990s English-language films
An American Tail (franchise)
Animated films about animals
Direct-to-video interquel films
Direct-to-video sequel films
Direct-to-video prequel films
Animated films about mice
Animated films about cats
Animated films about dogs
Films about nightmares
Animated films set in New York City
Animated films set in New York (state)
Universal Animation Studios animated films
Universal Pictures direct-to-video animated films
American prequel films